Medinilla magnifica, the showy medinilla or rose grape, is a species of flowering plant in the family Melastomataceae, native to the Philippines . It is an epiphyte. Various species and hybrids in this family are well known and popular with plant collectors with Medinilla speciosa being found almost identical.

Description
The plant grows up to 3 m tall, with opposite, firm, leathery leaves, which grow to 20–30 cm long in an ovate shape with a short point. The flowers grow in panicles up to 50 cm long, with ovid pink bracts. The individual flowers are up to 25 mm in size, and are pink, red or violet. The fruits are violet, fleshy berries, about 1 cm wide.

In the Philippines M. magnifica grows in the forks of large trees.  It is an epiphyte, which is a plant that grows on other trees but does not withdraw its food from those trees as parasites do.

Cultivation
In the tropics, it is grown as a perennial. It is also a common house plant in cooler climes. King Boudewijn of Belgium was a big devotee of Medinilla. He grew them in the royal conservatories and they were depicted on the bank note of 10,000 Belgian francs.

In temperate zones this plant must be grown under protection all year round, as it does not tolerate temperatures below . It requires high humidity levels, and bright sunlight with shade at the hottest time of the day. It has gained the Royal Horticultural Society’s Award of Garden Merit.

Etymology
Medinilla is named for José de Medinilla y Pineda, who was governor of Mauritius (then known as the Marianne Islands) in 1820.

Magnifica means 'magnificent', 'great', 'eminent', or 'distinguished'.

References

magnifica
Endemic flora of the Philippines
Plants described in 1850
Flora of the Philippines